Niels Hansen Jacobsen (September 10, 1861 – November 26, 1941) was a Danish sculptor and ceramist.
He is most famous for creating the once controversial sculpture, Trold, der vejrer kristenblod. The name of the statue is taken from a story in Norse folklore where the hero hides in the troll's castle. Thereafter, whenever the troll enters the castle, he cries: "I smell a Christian man's blood!"

Biography

Niels Hansen Jacobsen was born and grew up on a farm in Vejen.
He was the son of Carl Peter Jacobsen (1819-1903) and Anna Kirstine Hansen (1822–91).
He attended the Royal Danish Academy of Fine Arts in Copenhagen between  the years 1884-1888. At the Academy of Art, he received drawing lessons from Frederik Vermehren and Carl Bloch, while the sculptor Theobald Stein taught anatomy and Vilhelm Bissen in modeling.

He debuted  at the Charlottenborg Spring Exhibition in 1889. He was awarded the Eckersberg Medal and a  grant which led him to travel  
to Germany, Italy and France during 1891.  In 1892, Hansen Jacobsen settled in Paris. From the mid-1890s, Hansen Jacobsen had also started working with  ceramics. In 1902, Hansen Jacobsen returned to Denmark. In the years following his return to Denmark, a new field of work came to fill much in his production: cutting grave and memorial stones. 

In 1908, he returned to work on sculpture. In 1913, Hansen Jacobsen erected a studio at Skibelund Krat near Askov. Between 1923-24, a museum was built for the works of Hansen Jacobsen at the site of his birthplace. The museum was inaugurated on July 1, 1924 and is today the Vejen Art Museum (Vejen Kunstmuseum).

Work
Existential themes such as freedom and time affect Niels Hansen Jacobsen throughout much of his sculptures. With his imaginative and strangely  symbolic sculptures, Hansen Jacobsen  gave form to abstract phenomena such as death, night and shadow.

Personal life
In 1891, he married  Anna Gabriele Rohde (1862-1902). In 1908, he married Kaja Jørgensen (1882-1928).
In 1936, he was awarded the  Thorvaldsen Medal. 
He died during 1941 and was buried at Vejen Church.

Gallery

See also
Danish sculpture

References

Other sources
Teresa Nielsen (2011) NHJ : Niels Hansen Jacobsen (Vejen Kunstmuseum) 
Herman Madsen;  Niels Th. Mortensen (1990) Dansk Skulptur (Odense: Skandinavisk Bogforlag )

External links

1861 births
1941 deaths
20th-century Danish sculptors
Male sculptors
19th-century sculptors
19th-century Danish ceramists
20th-century Danish ceramists
People from Vejen Municipality
Royal Danish Academy of Fine Arts alumni
Recipients of the Thorvaldsen Medal
Recipients of the Eckersberg Medal
Danish male artists
20th-century Danish male artists